John "Reggie" Ruggiero is an American former NASCAR driver. He is known for his dominance in the NASCAR Whelen Modified Tour in the 1990s despite never winning the championship.

Racing career

NASCAR Busch Series
Ruggiero debuted in the Busch Series in 1987, where he drove the No. 90 Cox Chevrolet to a 10th place finish after he had started 20th. He returned to the car for the next race at Darlington, where he finished 26th after starting 27th. He was then replaced by Rusty Wallace for the remainder of the season.

In 1993, he drove the No. 13 Auto Palace Chevrolet at Loudon, and started 23rd. A crash caused him to finish 30th in the race.

His fourth and last race in the series was in 1995, where he drove his own No. 06 Chevrolet at Loudon to a 20th place finish after starting 18th.

NASCAR Whelen Modified Tour
Ruggiero raced in the Modified Tour from 1985 until 2009; a total of 24 years. He has participated in a total of 419 races in the series and won 44 of those races. He has also finished as runner-up in the points standings seven times.

Ruggiero has the second most wins in the series as of 2018, with 44 victories, 30 behind from Mike Stefanik's 74.

After racing
Ruggiero later found work in the chassis shop of Stewart-Haas Racing, where he helps them in building their cars. He has also been inducted into the New England Auto Racers Hall of Fame.

Motorsports career results

NASCAR
(key) (Bold – Pole position awarded by qualifying time. Italics – Pole position earned by points standings or practice time. * – Most laps led.)

Busch Series

References

External links
 

1951 births
Living people
NASCAR drivers
Racing drivers from Connecticut